The 2022 Incarnate Word Cardinals softball team represented the University of the Incarnate Word during the 2022 NCAA Division I softball season. The Cardinals played their home games at H-E-B Field and were led by first-year head coach Kimberly Dean. They were members of the Southland Conference.

Preseason

Southland Conference Coaches Poll
The Southland Conference Coaches Poll was released on February 4, 2022. Incarnate Word was picked to finish fifth in the Southland Conference with 84 votes.

Preseason All-Southland team
No players from Incarnate Word were chosen to the team

National Softball Signing Day

Personnel

Schedule and results

Schedule Source:
*Rankings are based on the team's current ranking in the NFCA/USA Softball poll.

References

Incarnate Word
Incarnate Word Cardinals softball
Incarnate Word Cardinals softball